Batho may refer to:

Basotho Batho Democratic Party, political party in Lesotho
Batho baronets, holders of the Batho Baronetcy title, of Frinton in Essex
Batho Pele (Sotho: "People First"), a South African political initiative
Delphine Batho (born 1973), French Minister of Ecology, Sustainable Development and Energy, member of the Socialist Party
Edith Clara Batho (1895–1986), Principal of Royal Holloway College, University of London (RHC) from 1945 to 1962